Calam Finbar Lynch (born 7 November 1994) is a British actor of Irish descent. His films include the Disney adaptation of Black Beauty (2020) and Terence Davies' Benediction (2021). On television, he appeared in the BBC One drama Mrs Wilson (2018).

Early life
Lynch was born in Warwickshire to Irish actors Niamh Cusack and Finbar Lynch. He spent some of his childhood in Mottram St Andrew, Cheshire and attended the local primary academy whilst his parents worked in Manchester. They then moved to Barnes, South West London. He attended Latymer Upper School in Hammersmith before going on to study Classics at Somerville College, Oxford, graduating in 2017. Originally interested in football, he became inspired to act by his cousin Max Irons and participated in stage productions during his time at university.

Career
In his third and final year at Oxford, Lynch signed with an agent and appeared in Dunkirk. After graduating, he played Claudio in the Rose Theatre Kingston production of Much Ado About Nothing and Gordon Wilson, the son of the titular character played by Ruth Wilson in the BBC One miniseries Mrs Wilson.
That same year, Lynch had a guest role as John-Paul O'Reilly in an episode of the Channel 4 sitcom Derry Girls. He appeared in Wife at the Kiln Theatre in 2019.

Lynch starred in the 2020 adaptation of Black Beauty opposite Mackenzie Foy, which was released on Disney+. He played Stephen Tennant in the Terence Davies-directed biographical film Benediction followed by a role in series 2 of the Netflix period drama Bridgerton.

Filmography

Film

Television

Stage

References

External links
 

Living people
1994 births
Alumni of Somerville College, Oxford
Cusack family (Ireland)
English people of Irish descent
English people of Northern Ireland descent
Male actors from London
Male actors from Warwickshire
People educated at Latymer Upper School
People from Barnes, London
People from the Borough of Cheshire East